The Brachyceran family Kovalevisargidae is an extinct group of flies known from the Jurassic Daohugou biota of China and the Karabastau Formation of Kazakhstan.

Taxonomy 
 †Kerosargus Mostovski 1997
 †Kerosargus argus Mostovski 1997 Karabastau Formation, Kazakhstan, Oxfordian
 †Kerosargus sororius Zhang 2011 Daohugou, China, Callovian
 †Kovalevisargus Mostovski 1997
 †Kovalevisargus brachypterus Zhang 2011 Daohugou, China, Callovian
 †Kovalevisargus clarigenus Mostovski 1997 Karabastau Formation, Kazakhstan, Oxfordian
 †Kovalevisargus haifanggouensis Zhang 2014 Haifanggou Formation, China, Callovian/Oxfordian
 †Kovalevisargus macropterus Zhang 2011 Daohugou, China, Callovian

References 

†
†
Prehistoric Diptera
Prehistoric insect families